John Alexander "Bid" McPhee (November 1, 1859 – January 3, 1943) was an American 19th-century Major League Baseball second baseman. He played 18 seasons in the majors, from  until , all for the Cincinnati Reds franchise. Known more for his fielding than his hitting, McPhee was the last second baseman to play without a glove.

Early career 
He played for Davenport for three seasons, shifting to second base during the  season. Before the  season, he signed a contract to play for the Cincinnati Red Stockings, a team in the newly formed American Association.

Major League Baseball career 
Making his major league debut on May 2, 1882, the 22-year-old McPhee had a batting average of just .228, but he led the league in several fielding categories, including putouts and fielding percentage. With McPhee in the lineup for 78 out of their 80 games, the Red Stockings won the inaugural AA championship. In last two seasons of his career, he was the oldest player in the major leagues.

Over 18 years, McPhee batted .272, hit 53 home runs, hit 189 triples, scored 1,684 runs, had 1,072 runs batted in, and stole 568 bases. He had ten 100-plus seasons in runs scored and regularly led the league in many defensive categories despite playing without a glove for the first 14 years of his career. Without the benefit of the padding provided by fielding gloves, McPhee toughened his hands by soaking them in salt water.

Shortly after retiring as a player in 1899, McPhee rejoined the Reds as a manager. At the team's helm for 1901 and part of 1902, he posted 79 wins and 124 losses for a .389 winning percentage.

Death and honors 
McPhee died in 1943. He was cremated and his ashes were interred in the mausoleum at Cypress View Memorial Gardens in San Diego, California.

He is the only Hall of Famer to spend significant time in the American Association. He is one of three Baseball Hall of Famers, along with Johnny Bench and Barry Larkin, who played their entire career in Cincinnati. McPhee is also the only Hall of Famer from the 1882 pennant-winning Cincinnati Red Stockings team.

Two years after his induction into the Baseball Hall of Fame, McPhee was inducted into the Cincinnati Reds Hall of Fame.

See also

List of Major League Baseball career hits leaders
List of Major League Baseball career triples leaders
List of Major League Baseball career runs scored leaders
List of Major League Baseball career runs batted in leaders
List of Major League Baseball career stolen bases leaders
List of Major League Baseball annual home run leaders
List of Major League Baseball annual triples leaders
List of Major League Baseball triples records
List of Major League Baseball players to hit for the cycle
List of Major League Baseball players who spent their entire career with one franchise

References

External links 

, or Retrosheet

1859 births
1943 deaths
19th-century baseball players
National Baseball Hall of Fame inductees
Major League Baseball second basemen
Cincinnati Red Stockings (AA) players
Cincinnati Reds players
Cincinnati Reds managers
Davenport Brown Stockings players
Baseball players from New York (state)
People from Massena, New York